Dominic Green (born 1970) is a British historian, columnist and musician. A Fellow of the Royal Historical Society and the Royal Society of Arts, he is editor of the US edition of The Spectator and a commissioning editor of The Critic. He is a columnist and film reviewer for The Spectator, and a columnist for The Daily Telegraph. He also writes frequently on books and arts for The Wall Street Journal, The New Criterion, The Spectator (UK), Standpoint, The Literary Review, and The Oldie. He has also written for The Atlantic, Commentary, The Economist, First Things, The Weekly Standard, CapX and the antiquities magazine Minerva.

Biography
Green is the son of the saxophonist and writer Benny Green and actress Toni Kanal, and the brother of saxophonist and BBC Radio presenter Leo Green. He read English Literature at St John's College, Oxford. Subsequently, he read for an AM in Jewish Studies at Harvard University, and a PhD in Comparative History at Brandeis University, where he was the Mandel Fellow in the Humanities.

Author
Green is the author of a biography of his father, Benny Green: Words and Music (2000), and editor of the collection Such Sweet Thunder: Benny Green on Jazz (2001). His first history book, The Double Life of Dr. Lopez: Spies, Shakespeare and the Plot to Poison Elizabeth I (2003) was described in The Sunday Times of London as 'popular history at its best'. Green's second history book, Three Empires on the Nile: The Victorian Jihad 1869-1899 (2007; UK title Armies of God) was acclaimed in media as varied as Foreign Affairs and Entertainment Weekly. In 2022, Green wrote The Religious Revolution: The Birth of Modern Spirituality, 1848-1898 which was published by Farrar, Straus & Giroux.

Political and social commentary
Green writes political and social
commentary for the US edition of The Spectator, the New York Post, the Jewish Chronicle, the Daily Telegraph, and the Wall Street Journal. Green's opinion pieces include frequent cricism of President Joe Biden as "senile" or mentally impaired and having "low energy", praise for President Donald Trump's policies and victory "on points" in the 2020 United States presidential debates, Greene criticised the FBI's criminal investigation of convicted sex offender Jeffrey Epstein, Ghislaine Maxwell, and Prince Andrew for failing to act quickly enough.

Jewish identity
Green has provoked controversy with articles on Jewish identity, criticising Joe Biden's agenda as "bad for the Jews" In response to Green's analysis, David Aaronovitch said that Green's politics are "Lindberghian" and warned that Green's characterisation of Jews is inaccurate and itself fosters antisemitism. Aaronovitch took special issue with Green criticising Biden for formally recognising the Armenian Genocide, since it damaged relations with Turkey, arguing that all Jews should support recognising genocides against people regardless of impact.

Musician
Green is a professional jazz guitarist and arranger. Artists he has worked with include Burt Bacharach, Elvis Costello, Dionne Warwick, Sacha Distel, Big Jay McNeely, Benny Green, Deniece Williams, Bettye Lavette, Ray Gelato, John Dankworth, Doris Troy, Kym Mazelle, Gary Baldwin Portishead, Colin Edwyn (Porcupine Tree), Danny Farrant (Buzzcocks), The Karminsky Experience Inc., and the James Taylor Quartet.

Television
Queen Elizabeth's Secret Agents (BBC/PBS, 2017); nominated for a Royal Television Society award, 2018.

Bibliography
 Benny Green: Words and Music, London, London House, 2000, 252p.
 The Double Life of Doctor Lopez: Spies, Shakespeare and the Plot to Poison Elizabeth I, London, Century, 2003, 402p.
Paperback reprint: Arrow Books Ltd., 2004, 
Three Empires on the Nile: The Victorian Jihad, 1869-1898, Free Press, January 2007, 304p. (also known as "Armies of God: Islam and Empire on the Nile, 1869-1899")

Edited
 Such Sweet Thunder: Benny Green on Jazz, Simon & Schuster, 2001,

References

1970 births
Living people
Alumni of St John's College, Oxford
English jazz guitarists
English male guitarists
English people of Russian-Jewish descent
21st-century British guitarists
21st-century British male musicians
British male jazz musicians
Brandeis University alumni
Harvard Graduate School of Arts and Sciences alumni